Makhalpara   is a village in Chanditala II community development block of Srirampore subdivision in Hooghly district in the Indian state of West Bengal.

Geography
Chanditala police station serves this Village.

Gram panchayat
Villages and census towns in Barijhati gram panchayat are: Barijhati, Beledanga, Gokulpur, Khanpur, Makhalpara and Thero.

Demographics
As per 2011 Census of India, Makhalpur had a total population of 113 of which 64 (57%) were males and 49 (43%) were females, with 9 of these individuals being under the age of 6. The total number of literates in Makhalpur was 97 (93.27% of the population over 6 years).

References 

Villages in Chanditala II CD Block